The re-version of Mighty Morphin Power Rangers (also known as Mighty Morphin Power Rangers 2010) is a television series created by Haim Saban and Shuki Levy, began airing January 2, 2010, on ABC Kids, and concluded on August 28, 2010. The re-version season was a re-broadcasting of approximately half of the first season of MMPR, which was originally broadcast in 1993, but BVS Entertainment added several visual effects to the old footage, in addition to an updated opening sequence. Although nothing beyond this about the television show was new, upon repurchase of the franchise by Haim Saban, it was nonetheless officially regarded as the 18th season of Power Rangers by his new company Saban Brands, until the promotion for Power Rangers Megaforce included season numbering that ignored the re-version.

Episodes
The episodes are aired in their production order rather than in chronological order.

Notes

References

External links
Mighty Morphin Power Rangers on the Internet Movie Database

Power Rangers episodes
Episodes
2010 American television seasons
Television articles with incorrect naming style